Cymindis decora is a species of ground beetle in the subfamily Harpalinae. It was described by Fischer Von Waldheim in 1829.

References

decora
Beetles described in 1829